St. Catherine's Valley is a 156.1 hectare biological Site of Special Scientific Interest southwest of the village of Marshfield, South Gloucestershire, notified in 1997.

At the Marshfield end of the valley, a large naturalised population of Dragon's Teeth (Tetragonolobus maritimus), a species not native to Britain, is present; it was first found by Rev. E. Ellman in 1927.

References

Sources

 English Nature citation sheet for the site  (accessed 16 July 2006)

Sites of Special Scientific Interest in Avon
Sites of Special Scientific Interest notified in 1997
Valleys of Gloucestershire